Rafał Smoliński (born 14 July 1977) is a Polish rower. He competed at the 2000 Summer Olympics and the 2004 Summer Olympics.

References

1977 births
Living people
Polish male rowers
Olympic rowers of Poland
Rowers at the 2000 Summer Olympics
Rowers at the 2004 Summer Olympics
Sportspeople from Toruń